{{DISPLAYTITLE:2003 LA7}}

, also written as 2003 LA7, is a resonant trans-Neptunian object that goes around the Sun once for every four times that Neptune goes around. This means it is in a 1:4 orbital resonance with Neptune.

2003 LA7 is in a 1:4 resonance with the planet Neptune. For every one orbit that a it makes, Neptune orbits 4 times.

It is currently 43 AU from the Sun, and will come to perihelion around 2041.

Assuming a generic TNO albedo of 0.09, it is about 231 km in diameter.

It has been observed 14 times over 4 oppositions.

See also 
  (a twotino)
  ("threetino")

References

External links 
 
 

Kuiper belt objects
Minor planet object articles (unnumbered)
Trans-Neptunian objects in a 1:4 resonance
?